

References

Billings
Tallest in Billings
Buildings and structures in Billings, Montana